Babajan (Bābā Jān Tepe also Romanized as Bābājān; also known as Bābākhān and Bābā Jān-e Zarrābī) is a village in Nurabad Rural District, in the Central District of Delfan County, Lorestan Province, Iran. At the 2006 census, its population was 663, in 151 families.

References 

Towns and villages in Delfan County